Bactris setulosa (syn. Bactris cuvaro H.Karst., Bactris cuesa Crueg. ex Griseb., Bactris falcata J.R.Johnst., Bactris sworderiana Becc., Bactris kalbreyeri Burret, Bactris circularis L.H.Bailey, Bactris bergantina Steyerm.) is a medium-sized (5–10 m tall, 6–10 cm in diameter) spiny palm which is found in Colombia, Venezuela, Ecuador, Peru, Trinidad and Tobago and Suriname.  It is one of the largest species of Bactris and is found at the highest elevations.

References

setulosa
Trees of Trinidad and Tobago
Trees of South America
Near threatened plants